Barnesville is a city and Fargo-Moorhead bedroom community in Clay County, Minnesota, United States.  The population is 2,759 at the 2020 census. Barnesville Potato Days is held there annually in August.

Interstate 94/U.S. Highway 52, as well as Minnesota State Highways 9 and 34 are four of the main routes in the city.

History
Barnesville was founded in 1874 by George S. Barnes, and named for him. A post office called Barnesville has been in operation since 1877. Barnesville was incorporated as a city in 1889.

Geography

Demographics

2010 census
As of the census of 2010, there were 2,563 people, 1,013 households, and 696 families living in the city. The racial makeup of the city was 98.3% White, 0.2% African American, 0.2% Native American, 0.2% Asian, 0.1% Pacific Islander, 0.2% from other races, and 0.8% from two or more races. Hispanic or Latino of any race were 0.7% of the population.

There were 1,013 households, of which 39.9% had children under the age of 18 living with them, 53.5% were married couples living together, 10.7% had a female householder with no husband present, 4.5% had a male householder with no wife present, and 31.3% were non-families. 27.5% of all households were made up of individuals, and 14% had someone living alone who was 65 years of age or older. The average household size was 2.50 and the average family size was 3.05.

The median age in the city was 36.2 years. 29.8% of residents were under the age of 18; 4.7% were between the ages of 18 and 24; 27.9% were from 25 to 44; 22.8% were from 45 to 64; and 14.8% were 65 years of age or older. The gender makeup of the city was 49.1% male and 50.9% female.

2000 census
As of the census of 2000, there were 2,173 people, 865 households, and 569 families living in the city. The racial makeup of the city was 99.40% White, 0.23% Native American, 0.14% Asian, 0.05% from other races, and 0.18% from two or more races. Hispanic or Latino of any race were 0.69% of the population.

There were 865 households, out of which 33.2% had children under the age of 18 living with them, 54.5% were married couples living together, 8.0% had a female householder with no husband present, and 34.2% were non-families. 31.2% of all households were made up of individuals, and 17.9% had someone living alone who was 65 years of age or older.  The average household size was 2.42 and the average family size was 3.05.

In the city, the population was spread out, with 26.6% under the age of 18, 7.3% from 18 to 24, 27.2% from 25 to 44, 19.9% from 45 to 64, and 19.1% who were 65 years of age or older.  The median age was 38 years. For every 100 females, there were 95.4 males.  For every 100 females age 18 and over, there were 89.8 males.

The median income for a household in the city was $35,814, and the median income for a family was $44,760. Males had a median income of $35,625 versus $22,311 for females. The per capita income for the city was $18,373.  About 3.4% of families and 6.7% of the population were below the poverty line, including 4.9% of those under age 18 and 16.4% of those age 65 or over.

Festivals
Barnesville Potato Days is held each year during the end of August, and draws approximately 14,000 people each year.

This top potato-growing region, the Red River Valley, touts its taters at potato-peeling and picking contests and food booths serving potato pancakes, dumplings, sausage and many other types of potato foods and plain types of food. The festival also includes a parade, car show, and street dances.

Barnesville also hosts the Clay County Fair in mid-July. The fair features rides, 4-H displays and other local attractions.

Education
Barnesville is the center of I.S.D. 146.  Atkinson Elementary is for students grades K–6; Barnesville High is grades 7–12.  There are about 820 students in the school system, with roughly 370 students enrolled in the high school, and around 450 in the elementary. The superintendent is Dr. Jon Ellerbusch. Barnesville's mascots are the Lady Trojans and Trojans.

Notable people
 Alta King (born 1899 in Barnesville), a dancer and Ziegfeld girl
 Neil Wohlwend, Minnesota state legislator, football and basketball coach

References

External links
 City of Barnesville

Cities in Minnesota
Cities in Clay County, Minnesota
1874 establishments in Minnesota